Euonychophora is an order of Onychophora representing all living onychophorans; the Peripatidae (including the fossil †Cretoperipatus) and Peripatopsidae. Their feet possess a pair of claws and a pad, and are covered with pustules. All remaining onychophorans are fossil species in the order Ontonychophora.

References

External links 
 

Onychophoran orders